The University of West Los Angeles (UWLA) is a private, for-profit law school in Los Angeles, California. It maintains two campuses, one in Inglewood (West Los Angeles) and one in Chatsworth (San Fernando Valley). For February 2022, its California Bar pass rate was 0% for first time takers.

History
UWLA was founded in 1966 by Henry Blunt and three other Culver City High School educators. The School of Law received approval from the Committee of Bar Examiners of The State Bar of California in 1978. The San Fernando Valley College of Law (the first law school in the San Fernando Valley), co-founded as an independent school by Leo L. Mann and Joseph P. Lamont in 1962, was acquired and merged into UWLA in 2002.

Robert W. Brown is the current President of the University while Jay Paul Frykberg was appointed Dean of the Law School in 2013.

Accreditation, admissions, and bar exam performance 
UWLA is accredited by the WASC Senior College and University Commission. The university's School of Law is approved by the State Bar of California Committee of Bar Examiners but is not accredited by the American Bar Association. As a result, graduates only qualify to take the bar exam in California. 

The school has a 100% acceptance rate, and an undergraduate degree is not necessary for admission.

For the February 2022 California Bar Examination, none of 18 UWLA graduates (0%) taking the exam for the first time passed (as compared to 61.8% for the average of all first time exam takers).

Notable alumni
 Evan Freed, J.D. 1978, attorney and photographer
 Albert L. Gordon, J.D. (San Fernando Valley College of Law) 1962, attorney, advocate for gay rights
 Louise Linton, J.D., (date unknown) actress, wife of Steve Mnuchin
 Frank K. Wheaton, J.D. 1982, sports agent, former radio host for KPFK Los Angeles, attorney

See also
 List of colleges and universities in California

References

External links
 

West Los Angeles
West Los Angeles, University of
Universities and colleges in the San Fernando Valley
Chatsworth, Los Angeles
Education in Inglewood, California
1966 establishments in California
For-profit universities and colleges in the United States
Private universities and colleges in California